Polytoma is a genus of green algae in the family Chlamydomonadaceae.
Polytoma is a genus of colorless, free-living chlorophytes similar in form to Chlamydomonas but lacking chlorophyll. Two flagella emanate from the anterior papilla of the cell, and cells have two contractile vacuoles at the flagellar base.  Polytoma possesses a leukoplast in place of a chloroplast, in which many starch grains are concentrated; there is no pyrenoid.  Since they lack photosynthetic capability, Polytoma species are entirely saprotrophic, obtaining nutrients from decaying organic matter.  Some species possess an eyespot apparatus (stigma) in the anterior portion of the leucoplast, but in others this organelle is absent.

References

External links

Chlamydomonadales genera
Chlamydomonadaceae
Taxa named by Christian Gottfried Ehrenberg